Booker T. Washington High School served African American students in Columbia, South Carolina. The Booker T. Washington High School Foundation was established to preserve and celebrate the school's heritage and legacy.

Educational historian Anthony L. Edwards has written about the school and its history and conducted interviews as part of his research.

The school's auditorium is listed on the National Register of Historic Places.

The University of South Carolina's Museum of Education hosts a web exhibition on the high school and its participation in a 1940 Association of Colleges and Secondary Schools for Negroes’ Secondary School Study.

Alumni
Ethel Martin Bolden

See also
 List of things named after Booker T. Washington

References

African-American history of South Carolina
School buildings on the National Register of Historic Places in South Carolina
Schools in Columbia, South Carolina